Conklin is a hamlet in northern Alberta, Canada within the Regional Municipality (RM) of Wood Buffalo. It is located on Highway 881 between Fort McMurray and Lac La Biche.

The hamlet is located in Census Division No. 16 and in the federal riding of Fort McMurray-Athabasca.

History 
The hamlet of Conklin was named for John Conklin, a railroad employee. It was originally situated at the extreme northwestern end of Christina Lake, adjacent to its outlet at the Jackfish River. When the Alberta and Great Waterways Railway (which eventually became part of the Northern Alberta Railway and later the Athabasca Northern Railway) reached Conklin in 1921, the town was relocated alongside the railway tracks.

Conklin was an important centre for the local fur trade from 1940 to 1960. Mink pelts from several mink farms in the area were transferred by canoe and dogsled to the railway siding at Conklin for shipment to markets.

From 1940 to 1960 there was heavy commercial fishing in Christina Lake, and a fish processing plant was located at the outlet to the Jackfish River.

Conklin lies within the Athabasca Oil Sands region, and Cenovus Energy has been operating its Christina Lake project in the area since 2000.

Demographics 

The population of Conklin according to the 2018 municipal census conducted by the Regional Municipality of Wood Buffalo is 229, a decrease from its 2012 municipal census population count of 318.

See also 
List of communities in Alberta
List of designated places in Alberta
List of hamlets in Alberta

References 

Hamlets in Alberta
Designated places in Alberta
Regional Municipality of Wood Buffalo